Ennomos quercaria, the clouded August thorn, is a moth of the family Geometridae. The species was first described by Jacob Hübner in 1813. It is mostly found in southern Europe. There are two dubious records from Britain, one in the 19th century, then again in south-east England in 1992.

The wingspan is 28–35 mm. Adults are on wing from June to September.

The larvae feed on various Quercus species.

External links

Clouded August thorn at UKMoths
Fauna Europaea
Lepiforum e.V.

Ennomini
Moths of Europe
Moths of Asia
Taxa named by Jacob Hübner